Stephen Townesend was Dean of Exeter between 1583 and 1588.

Notes

Deans of Exeter